Edward S. Porter (October 19, 1848 – June 13, 1902) was a physician in Louisville, Kentucky. He was a physician for the Louisville city sanitary force, the Orphan's home, at the nearby insane asylum, and at Simmons College of Kentucky.

Early life
Edward S. Porter was born in Delaware on October 19, 1848 to Jesse and Priscilla Porter. He attended Lincoln University in Oxford, Pennsylvania for seven years, finally getting a Bachelor of Arts in 1873. He then attended the Brooklyn Medical College graduating in 1876. He was also a graduate of Bellevue Hospital Medical College in New York City.

Career
After schooling, he moved to Tennessee for one year before moving to Louisville, Kentucky in about 1878. In 1881 he became physician at the State University (later Simmons College of Kentucky) and was a professor there. He was elected a part of the Louisville city sanitary force in 1882-1884. He was also physician at the Orphan's home starting in 1882. He was secretary of the Board of Commissioners for the Central Asylum for the Insane until two years before his death, living in nearby Anchorage, Kentucky. In about 1870 he began to be associated with the Louisville Gas Company, and from about 1882 until his death he was the company's secretary.

Family and death
He was a member of the Fifth Street Baptist church in Louisville and sang in the church choir. He married Lucy Bohannon on March 20, 1884 He later remarried Emma Young. He died on June 13, 1902 of tuberculosis in Louisville. He had been ill for a number of years prior and had spent some time in California and Las Vegas, Nevada to recuperate before his death. He was survived by four daughters: Mrs. W. L. Mapother, Evelyn, Florence, and Alice, as well as two siblings, Walter and Alice. His funeral was at the home of a brother-in-law and he was buried at Cave Hill Cemetery

References

1848 births
1902 deaths
Simmons College of Kentucky faculty
Physicians from Louisville, Kentucky
African-American physicians
Physicians from Kentucky
Lincoln University (Pennsylvania) alumni
Burials at Cave Hill Cemetery
Physicians from Delaware
20th-century African-American people
19th-century American physicians
Bellevue Hospital Medical College alumni